Vikramaditya Khanna is a professor of law at the University of Michigan Law School, and the founding and current editor of the India Law Abstracts and the White Collar Crime Abstracts on the Social Science Research Network. 

He earned his S.J.D. at Harvard Law School and has been visiting faculty at Harvard Law School, a senior research fellow at Columbia Law School and Yale Law School, and a visiting scholar at Stanford Law School. He was a recipient of the John M. Olin Faculty Fellowship for 2002–2003, and his areas of research and teaching interest include corporate and securities laws, law in India, corporate governance in emerging markets, corporate crime, corporate and managerial liability, and law and economics. He is a faculty member of the International Policy Center at the University of Michigan. 

Khanna testified before of the U.S. Senate Judiciary Committee on matters related to white-collar crime. He was appointed special master in a dispute between an Indian company and an American company. Khanna discussed his research on India at the Securities and Exchange Board of India. Khanna's papers have been published in a number of academic journals including the Harvard Law Review, Michigan Law Review, Journal of Empirical Legal Studies, Boston University Law Review, and the Georgetown Law Journal. He has given talks at Harvard, Columbia, Berkeley, Wharton, Stanford, Yale, European Financial Management Association Annual Meeting, American Law & Economics Association Annual Meeting, Conference on Empirical Legal Studies, NBER, and a number of venues in the US, India, China, Turkey, Canada, Greece and Singapore.

Khanna has taught the following courses; Enterprise Organization, Corporate Lawyer: Law & Ethics, Securities Regulation, Corporate Governance and Stock Market Development: India, China and Other Large Emerging Markets, Law & Economic Development: India; Corporate & White Collar Crime; Impact of Sarbanes-Oxley on Doing Business.

References

External links
Personal web page

20th-century American lawyers
Living people
University of Michigan Law School faculty
Harvard Law School alumni
Harvard Law School faculty
Year of birth missing (living people)